Pakistan Justice and Democratic Party (PJDP) or simply Justice and Democratic Party is a Pakistani political party launched on 25 December 2015 by Iftikhar Muhammad Chaudhry, former Chief Justice of Pakistan.

Office bearers
1. Justice (r) Iftikhar Muhammad Chaudhry - President

2. Sheikh Ahsan Ud Din Adv - Sr. Vice President

3. Abdul Wahab Baloch - General Secretary

3. Saliheen Mughal Adv - Vice President ICT

4. Muhammad Badar Ud Duja - Secretary Central Secretariat, Media Coordinator/Social Media

3. Malik Saleh Adv - Vice President Rawalpindi, Punjab Organisations Committee

4. Mahram Khan - becoming a member of NA 57 and party Organizer of Fatehjang

5. Fahmida Butt - Central Secretary Information

6. Aamir Mughal Adv - Central Finance Secretary

References

Political parties in Pakistan
Political parties established in 2015
2015 establishments in Pakistan